Pristine is a VC funded startup that develops software for hands-free smartglasses and smart mobile devices, enabling video collaboration and remote support in industrial and manufacturing environments, field service management and healthcare. Pristine is based in Austin, Texas.

History
Pristine was founded by Kyle Samani and Patrick Kolencherry May 2013, shortly after Google announced the Google Glass program. It raised initial funding through angel investors and began piloting in a major academic medical center. In the months following, Pristine raised over $5 million in venture capital investment from S3 Ventures, Capital Factory, Healthfundr, and others.

Pristine took second place at HATCH Pitch 2013, a start up pitch competition that was held at the George R. Brown Convention Center. At the 2013 DEMO conference, Pristine CEO Kyle Samani demonstrated on stage how an emergency room surgeon would use Google Glass to request support from another physician.

University of California, Irvine participated in a smartglasses pilot in October 2013, and announced in February the following year that they would roll out the technology to outpatient programs and wound care.

Pristine launched the first Google Glass pilot in an emergency room at Rhode Island Hospital in April 2014. It resulted in a peer-reviewed study published in JAMA Dermatology on the use of smartglasses in a healthcare environment.

Partners
Pristine is one of the ten official partners of Google’s Glass at Work program. The company also has formal partnerships with Vuzix, as well as Epson.

Products
Pristine develops software for smartglasses to enable hands free video collaboration, and supports mobile-to-mobile capabilities on web browsers, Android and iOS platforms. Built on WebRTC, MongoDB, Redis, AngularJS, the technology supports secure two-way audio and video, messaging, annotations, and high resolution snapshots.

See also
 Augmented reality
 Hands-free computing
 mHealth
 Telehealth

References

Display technology companies
Telemedicine
Telepresence
Teleconferencing
Emerging technologies
Companies based in Austin, Texas
American companies established in 2013
2013 establishments in Texas
Privately held companies based in Texas
Software companies based in Texas
Defunct software companies of the United States